Korsvik (former: Korsvig) is an urban area in Kristiansand municipality in Agder county, Norway. It is located in the districts of Søm and Randesund, south of the European route E18 highway and the Varodd Bridge.

References

Villages in Agder
Geography of Kristiansand
Kristiansand region